Club Atlético Douglas Haig is an Argentine football club from Pergamino, Buenos Aires Province, which plays in the country's Third Division.

The club is named in honour of Field Marshal Sir Douglas Haig, a victorious General from World War I

History
In November 1918 a group of British workers on the Argentinian Central Railroad set up a football team to take part in the local soccer championship. This required the consent and support of the Chief of the railway, Mr. Ronald Leslie, who, as a condition, requested that the new club name itself in honour of Sir Douglas Haig, the Commander-in-Chief of the British Armies in Western Europe, who had just led them to victory in World War I. Club Atlético Douglas Haig was thereby founded on 18 November 1918.

Divisional level 
The team won the 2011–12 Torneo Argentino A championship, promoting it to the Second Division of Argentine football, Primera B Nacional where it currently played until 2016–17.

Players

Current squad

Honours

National
Torneo Argentino A (1): 2011–12
Torneo Argentino B (1): 2009–10

Regional
Liga de Pergamino (26): 1920, 1922, 1923, 1924, 1927, 1928, 1933, 1934, 1935, 1936, 1950, 1962, 1964,  1966, 1979, 1980, 1981, 1982, 1983, 1984, 1985, 2000, 2001, 2002, 2003, 2010
Torneo de la Provincia de Buenos Aires (1): 1986

Notes

References

External links

 
 Douglas Manía

Douglas Haig
Association football clubs established in 1918
1918 establishments in Argentina
Douglas Haig, 1st Earl Haig